Lauchringen station is a railway station in the town of Lauchringen, Baden-Württemberg, Germany. The station is located at the junction of the lies on the High Rhine Railway and Wutach Valley Railway, although there is no service over the latter from this station.

Services 
 the following services stop at Lauchringen:

 RB: hourly service to Basel Bad Bf.

References

External links
 
 

Railway stations in Baden-Württemberg
Buildings and structures in Waldshut (district)